"Ain't Gonna Lie" is a popular song written by Tony Powers and George Fischoff. The song was a 1966 hit for Keith peaking at No. 39 on the Billboard Hot 100 chart.

The song was also released as a single by the Gene Cipriano Trio, and was performed by the Rolling Stones during their 1981 tour. The song was included on the Rolling Stones' unofficial live album Mona.

References 

The Rolling Stones songs
1966 singles
1966 songs
Mercury Records singles
Songs written by Tony Powers
Songs written by George Fischoff